Lilly the Witch: The Journey to Mandolan is a 2011 German comedy film directed by Harald Sicheritz. It is the second Lilly the Witch film, being preceded by Lilly the Witch: The Dragon and the Magic Book.

Cast
 Alina Freund as Lilly
 Pilar Bardem as Surulunda
 Pegah Ferydoni as Leila
 Anja Kling as Mother
 Tanay Chheda as Musa
 Michael Mendl as Nandi
 Lars Rudolph as Kellner
 Isak Férriz
 Jürgen Tarrach as Guliman
 Alexander Yassin as Minister
 Michael Mittermeier as Hektor (voice)
 Cosma Shiva Hagen as Suki (voice)

References

External links
 

2011 films
2011 comedy films
2010s children's comedy films
2010s fantasy comedy films
German children's films
German fantasy comedy films
2010s German-language films
Walt Disney Pictures films
Films with live action and animation
Films about dragons
Films about witchcraft
2010s children's fantasy films
Films based on children's books
German sequel films
2010s German films